Doping may refer to:

 Doping, adding a dopant to something
 Doping (semiconductor), intentionally introducing impurities into an extremely pure semiconductor to change its electrical properties
 Aircraft dope, a lacquer that is applied to fabric-covered aircraft
 Link doping, in search engine optimization

Sports
 Doping in sport, the use of drugs or other methods to improve athletic performance
 Abortion doping, the rumoured practice of purposely inducing pregnancy for performance-enhancing benefits, then aborting
 Blood doping, boosting the number of red blood cells in the bloodstream
 Boosting (doping), a method of inducing autonomic dysreflexia
 Gene doping, the hypothetical non-therapeutic use of gene therapy by athletes
 Stem cell doping
 Technology doping
 Doping in China
 Doping in Russia

See also
 Dope (disambiguation)
 Dopey (disambiguation)
 Dopping cement